XHQQQ-FM is a radio station on 89.3 FM in Villahermosa, Tabasco, Mexico. The station is owned by Radio Núcleo and is known as La Ke Buena with a grupera format.

History
XHQQQ began as XEQQQ-AM 1340 transmitting from Teapa, Tabasco. It changed to 880 when moving to Villahermosa. In 2010, it migrated to FM on 89.3 MHz.

On January 1, 2020, Radio Núcleo handed over operation of its three Villahermosa stations to Grupo Radio Comunicación, with resulting format and name changes for all three; XHQQQ remained in the grupera format as "Fiesta Mexicana". After nine months, Radio Núcleo resumed direct operations and announced the return of the previous La Ke Buena franchise format.

References

Radio stations in Tabasco
Villahermosa